Rosana Simón  Álamo  (born 11 July 1989) is a female taekwondo practitioner from Spain.

She won the gold medal in the heavyweight division (+73 kg) at the 2009 World Taekwondo Championships in Copenhagen, Denmark. In the gold medal match, Simón beat Liu Rui of China 6–4, landing a game-leading 3-point kick to the head against the Chinese opponent and knocking her down with 15 seconds left in the final round.

References

External links

1988 births
Spanish female taekwondo practitioners
Living people
People from La Palma
Sportspeople from the Province of Santa Cruz de Tenerife
Mediterranean Games bronze medalists for Spain
Competitors at the 2013 Mediterranean Games
Universiade medalists in taekwondo
Mediterranean Games medalists in taekwondo
Universiade bronze medalists for Spain
European Taekwondo Championships medalists
World Taekwondo Championships medalists
Medalists at the 2015 Summer Universiade
European Games competitors for Spain
Taekwondo practitioners at the 2015 European Games
20th-century Spanish women
21st-century Spanish women